Dolegna del Collio () is a comune (municipality) in the Province of Gorizia in the Italian region Friuli-Venezia Giulia, located about  northwest of Trieste and about  northwest of Gorizia, on the border with Slovenia.

The municipality of Dolegna del Collio contains the frazioni (subdivisions, mainly villages and hamlets) Mernicco, Restoccina, Ruttars, Scriò, Trussio, Breg, Lonzano, Venco, and Barbana nel Collio.

Dolegna del Collio borders the following municipalities: Brda (Slovenia), Cormons, Corno di Rosazzo, Prepotto.

Demographic evolution

References

Cities and towns in Friuli-Venezia Giulia